Mechell is a community in the north of the Isle of Anglesey, Wales. Llanfechell is the largest village within the community area. Tregele, Llanfflewyn, Mynydd Mechell, Bodewryd, Rhosbeirio and Carreglefn have a more dispersed settlement pattern. The antiquity of these settlements is shown by the presence of 6 medieval (or older) churches and some 16 more ancient sites dating back into prehistory.

The population of the community in 2011 was 1,293.

Situation
Mechell's settlements are all on inland situations, although a narrow strip of land reaches up as far as the north coast of the island, east of Cemaes Bay, in Llanbadrig Community. To the east is Cylch-y-Garn Community, and to the south is Tref Alaw and Rhosybol.

There are three wards within the Mechell community council area, with a total of 10 councillors representing Llanfechell, Mynydd Mechell and Carreglefn, plus a chairperson.

Prior to the 2012 Anglesey electoral boundary changes Mechell was an electoral ward for the county council. It is now part of a new Talybolion ward.

History

The oldest of the settlements appears to be Llanfechell, named, as is the larger community, after the 6th century saint Mechell, reputedly a Breton missionary. Tradition has it that he is buried in Llanfechell. The large number of prehistoric sites attest to human habitation across the Community since well before that.

There is a very detailed account of daily life in the Mechell area during the 18th century, within the diaries of William Bulkeley, (1691-1760). He lived at Brynddu, a house on the edge of Llanfechell, and kept a daily record of Anglesey life from  1734 to 1760.

Economy
The land of Mechell Community is a settled agricultural landscape, with a network of small farms. The longstanding importance of arable agriculture is shown by the remains of four watermills and three windmills in the Mechell area: Meddanen Water Mill and Melin Mechell Windmill (also known as Minffordd Mill and Melin Maen Arthur) are close together so could have been worked by the same miller, utilising water and wind as available. Further south is Pant y Gŵydd, the second windmill. To the west, along the Afon Cafnan, was a series of mills, including the Cefn Coch Water Mill and Windmill, the Pandy Cefn Coch (a fulling mill), and Cafnan Water Mill at the mouth of the river.

It was the only Nuclear Power Station in Wales after Trawsfynedd shut down. The site produced electricity from 1971, and ceased at the end of 2015. Proposals from Horizon Nuclear Power to build 'Wylfa Newydd' are under consideration.

Mechel Churches: Church in Wales
Mechell Community has 4 Church in Wales buildings in the Bangor Diocese and Bro Padrig Deanery,

St Mechell's Church, Llanfechell (Grade II* listed). 12th century church with 19th century rebuild. SH369913 .

St Fflewin's Church, Llanfflewin (Grade II listed) in  Mynydd Mechell. Documentary records from 1254, but the oldest extant fabric appears to be 18th century, extensively restored in the 1930s. SH350890 .

St Mary's Church, Bodewryd (Grade II listed). The present structure is from the 16th century or earlier, and on a much earlier site. The original dedication was to St Gewryd. SH400906, .

St Peirio's Church, Rhosbeirio Grade II listed, now disused. SH391917. .

Capel Anhunedd-y-Pran There is a redundant (or decayed) medieval chapel at Clegyrog. By 1796 it was in use as a cowhouse. SH388903, Coordinates:.

Cappel Newsaint An unlocated medieval chapel stood somewhere in Mynydd Mechell. SH3590. .

Mechell non-conformist Chapels
There have been least nine non=conformist Chapels in the Mechell area, dating to the nineteenth and early 20th centuries:-

Libanus Chapel, Llanfechell Methodistiaid Calfinaidd, Welsh Calvanistic Methodist Chapel on the village square. Founded in 1832, rebuilt in 1903. SH369912. 

Ebenezer Chapel, Llanfechell Welsh Independent chapel near the School, on Mountain Road. Built 1862, replacing a Chapel built soon after 1800. SH365909, 

Calfaria Chapel, Mynydd Mechell Welsh Baptist chapel built in 1897 to replace an earlier building of 1815. SH361900 

Jerusalem Chapel, Mynydd Mechell Methodistiaid Calfinaidd, Welsh Calvanistic Methodist chapek. SH358897, 

Bethlehem Chapel, Carreglefn Welsh Calvinistic Methodist chapel. SH383891, 

Seion Chapel, Carreglefn Independent Chapel. SH394895,

Hephsibah Chapel, Rhosbeirio Former Welsh Calvinistic Methodist Chapel, converted into a house in 1985. SH394913, 

Capel Bethania, Tregele The Calvinistic Methodist cause at Tregele began in 1810. The Chapel was rebuilt in 1906 and closed in 1973  and is now a house.

Mechell notable buildings
All four extant medieval churches above are given the legal protection of Listed Building status. Below are the other listed buildings within the community, plus some other notable buildings and structures:-

Bodewryd
 
Plas Bodewryd (Grade II* listed mansion). A 15th/16th century Hall house at Bodewryd, with substantial additions in every century following. SH40019082, .

Bodewryd Colomendy or Dovecote, Bodewryd Grade II listed late 17th C. dovecote in the grounds of Plas Bodewryd. Stone walls incorporate around 400 nests. SH40019082, .

Lychgate at Church of St Mary, Bodewryd Grade II listed building. SH40119057, .

Llanfechell
Brynddu, Llanfechell Grade II listed 18th Century larger Anglesey house. Home of the Bulkeley Family. SH37329119 .

Pont-y-Plas, Llanfechell Road Bridge with square headed arches and steps to water. SH36889135||.

Crown Terrace, including Crown House, Llanfechell Grade II listed row of three terraced buildings with a shop/bank. SH369912, .

Old Rectory, Llanfechell Grade II listed, 17th Century Rectory, with 18th C additions. SH36989128, 

War Memorial, Llanfechell Grade II listed memorial to the fallen of the Great War, in the village square and incorporates a clock. SH37029120||

Mynydd Mechell
Ffynnon Ddygfael, Mynydd Mechell Well shaft close to a pool. SH35119050||.

Llanddygfael-groes, Mynydd Mechell Grade II listed building. SH35149059||.

Tregele
Cae Mawr, Tregele Grade II listed late 18th century farmhouse. SH34929088||.

Cefn-Coch, Tregele Grade II listed ||17th century central hall type house, with pointed internal doorways and 17th C. balusters. SH34259072 .

Groesfechan, Tregele Medieval domestic remains. SH351917||

Melin Cefn Coch (Ty'n y Felin), Tregele Grade II listed building. SH34319139, .

Carreglefn
Cottage at Pant-y-Gist, Carreglefn Grade II Listed Building, SH39358967, .

Hen Bont, Carreglefn Grade II listed building. SH38408907||.

Pant-y-cryntach, Carreglefn Grade II listed building. SH38808967, 

Ty Newydd, Carreglefn Grade II listed building. SH38408907, .

Y Stryd, Carreglefn Grade II listed building. SH38398906,

Llanfflewyn, near Mynydd Mechell
Twll-y-clawdd, Llanfflewyn Grade II listed building. SH35638861, .

Archaeological sites
There are five Scheduled monuments within the community area, all of them dating to prehistory, and a further 10 sites are also listed by the Royal Commission on the Ancient and Historical Monuments of Wales. All the sites are in open country within the community aea, so cannot be said to be in any one of the settlements. The 'settlement' column is there to give a guide as to which part of Mechell Community it is in.

Other Archaeological sites in Mechell:-

See also
List of Scheduled Monuments in Anglesey

References

 
Former wards of Anglesey